Posse is a shortened form of posse comitatus, a group of people summoned to assist law enforcement. The term is also used colloquially to mean a group of friends or associates.
 
Posse may also refer to:

Arts and entertainment
 Posse (1975 film), US Western film produced, directed and starring Kirk Douglas
 Posse (1993 film), US revisionist Western film directed by and starring Mario Van Peebles
 "Posse (I Need You on the Floor)", a 2001 single by German band Scooter
 Posse cut, a type of Hip Hop song with four or more rappers, in which each verse is sung by a different person
 Posse mit Gesang, a form of German musical drama
 Posse (band), an American indie rock band started in 2010 in Seattle

Other uses
 Posse (horse), a thoroughbred racehorse
 Posse (surname), including a list of people with the name
 Posse, Goiás, a municipality in the northeast of the Brazilian state of Goiás  
 Posse Foundation, a US nonprofit organization that identifies, recruits, and trains student leaders from public high schools to form multicultural teams
 POSSE project (Portable Open Source Security Elements), a software security initiative
 POSSE, a social web and IndieWeb abbreviation for "Publish (on your) Own Site, Syndicate Elsewhere"; see Micro.blog
 Jamaican posse, a loose coalition of street gangs

See also 
 Posse comitatus (disambiguation)
 Insane Clown Posse